The Vermont Land Trust is a non-profit environmental organization in the U.S. state of Vermont, working to conserve productive, recreational, and scenic lands which give the state and its communities their rural character.

History
The Vermont Land Trust was founded in 1977 by a group of citizens concerned about the rapidly accelerating development that threatened open space in Vermont. The founding group feared that state legislation Act 250 and local zoning was not strong enough to protect the rural character of the state.

Operation
The trust provides the money to purchase undeveloped land when necessary. It then protects the land with a special easement which prevents development. It then sells the land to interested purchasers, which may be the state government. In selling the land, the trust principal is continually renewed.

The organization works with The Nature Conservancy.

Officers
 President - Gilbert Livingston. Salary - $101,079
 Vice-President - Barbara Wagner. Salary - $92,484
 Vice-President - Elise Annes. Salary - $76,820

Notes

External links
 

Land trusts in the United States
Environmental organizations based in Vermont
Non-profit organizations based in Vermont
Organizations established in 1977
1977 establishments in Vermont